Cadella is a genus of bivalves belonging to the family Tellinidae.

The genus has almost cosmopolitan distribution.

Species

Species:

Cadella coltroi 
Cadella crebrimaculata 
Cadella delta

References

Tellinidae
Bivalve genera